This is a list of the 16 appointed members of the European Parliament for Finland in the 1994 to 1999 session, from 1 January 1995 until 9 October 1996. The first direct elections were held on 10 October 1996.

List

Finland
List
1995